The List of shipwrecks in 1790 includes ships sunk, foundered, wrecked, grounded or otherwise lost during 1790.

January

22 January

23 January

24 January

27 January

Unknown date

February

5 February

Unknown date

March

8 March

19 March

24 March

31 March

Unknown date

April

7 April

10 April

12 April

20 April

Unknown date

May

11 May

24 May

Unknown date

June

19 June

22 June

Unknown date

July

2 July

9 July

20 July

24 July

Unknown date

August

9 August

Unknown date

September

1 September

9 September

13 September

19 September

Unknown date

October

1 October

12 October

14 October

16 October

25 October

Unknown date

November

13 November

26 November

Unknown date

December

1 December

6 December

10 December

14 December

22 December

24 December

26 December

Unknown date

Unknown date

References

1790